Tampere Stadium, also known as Ratina Stadium, designed by architect Timo Penttilä and completed in 1965, is a multi-purpose stadium in Tampere, Finland, with a seating capacity of 16,800 people, and up to 32,000 people for concerts. In 2018, the stadium hosted the IAAF World U20 Championships.

Football
The stadium primarily hosts football matches. It served as Tampere United's home stadium and it will be the home stadium for Finnish national team between 2016 and 2018 due to the renovation of the Helsinki Olympic Stadium. The stadium was also formerly used by Ilves, which holds the record attendances for football matches in both European and domestic competitions: 24,873 against Juventus on 19 September 1984 in the European Cup and 15,000 against Kokkolan Palloveikot on 9 October 1983 in the Finnish League.

Music
Over the years the stadium has hosted several music events. In addition to standalone concerts, it serves as the main arena for the annual hip hop festival Blockfest.

Concerts

Speedway
Tampere Stadium is also used as a venue for Motorcycle speedway. It was first used for international competition in 1974 as the host of the Nordic Final as part of the qualifying for the Speedway World Championship. The Nordic Final was also held in Tampere in 1977 and 1989. The stadium also hosted the Finland National Championship on occasions.

The stadium played host to the 1995 World Under-21 Championship Final won by Australia's Jason Crump, and in 2014 the stadium hosted the inaugural Speedway Grand Prix of Finland won by Slovenian rider Matej Zagar. Speedway returned to Ratina the following year, with the Finnish Grand Prix as Round 2 of the 2015 Speedway Grand Prix series. The speedway track is laid out over the stadium’s  athletics track.

See also
 Blockfest
 Ratina (shopping centre)
 Tampere Arena

References

External links
 
 City of Tampere – Tampere Stadium

Venues of the 1952 Summer Olympics
Olympic football venues
Sports venues in Finland
Football venues in Finland
Finland national football team
Buildings and structures in Tampere
Multi-purpose stadiums in Finland
Tampere United
Sports venues completed in 1965